Caulanthus cooperi is a species of flowering plant in the family Brassicaceae known by the common name Cooper's wild cabbage. It is native to the southwestern United States and Baja California, where it is a common plant in a number of open, sandy habitats. This annual herb produces a slender, somewhat twisted stem with widely lance-shaped to oblong leaves clasping it. The flower has a rounded or urn-shaped coat of pinkish or pale greenish sepals enclosing light yellow or pale purple petals. The fruit is a straight or curving silique several centimeters long.

References

External links
Jepson Manual Treatment of Caulanthus cooperi
USDA Plants Profile
Caulanthus cooperi — U.C. Photo gallery

cooperi
Flora of Arizona
Flora of Baja California
Flora of California
Flora of Nevada
Flora of Utah

Flora of the California desert regions
Flora of the Great Basin
Flora of the Sonoran Deserts
Natural history of the Mojave Desert
Natural history of the Peninsular Ranges
Natural history of the Santa Monica Mountains
Plants described in 1877
Flora without expected TNC conservation status